Figure of the Earth is a term of art in geodesy that refers to the size and shape used to model Earth. The size and shape it refers to depend on context, including the precision needed for the model. A sphere is a well-known historical approximation of the figure of the Earth that is satisfactory for many purposes. Several models with greater accuracy (including ellipsoid) have been developed so that coordinate systems can serve the precise needs of navigation, surveying, cadastre, land use, and various other concerns.

Motivation 
Earth's topographic surface is apparent with its variety of land forms and water areas. This topographic surface is generally the concern of topographers, hydrographers, and geophysicists. While it is the surface on which Earth measurements are made, mathematically modeling it while taking the irregularities into account would be extremely complicated.

The Pythagorean concept of a spherical Earth offers a simple surface that is easy to deal with mathematically. Many astronomical and navigational computations use a sphere to model the Earth as a close approximation. However, a more accurate figure is needed for measuring distances and areas on the scale beyond the purely local. Better approximations can be made by modeling the entire surface as an oblate spheroid, using spherical harmonics to approximate the geoid, or modeling a region with a best-fit reference ellipsoid.

For surveys of small areas, a planar (flat) model of Earth's surface suffices because the local topography overwhelms the curvature. Plane-table surveys are made for relatively small areas without considering the size and shape of the entire Earth. A survey of a city, for example, might be conducted this way.

By the late 1600s, serious effort was devoted to modeling the Earth as an ellipsoid, beginning with Jean Picard's measurement of a degree of arc along the Paris meridian. Improved maps and better measurement of distances and areas of national territories motivated these early attempts. Surveying instrumentation and techniques improved over the ensuing centuries. Models for the figure of the earth improved in step.

In the mid- to late 20th century, research across the geosciences contributed to drastic improvements in the accuracy of the figure of the Earth. The primary utility of this improved accuracy was to provide geographical and gravitational data for the inertial guidance systems of ballistic missiles. This funding also drove the expansion of geoscientific disciplines, fostering the creation and growth of various geoscience departments at many universities. These developments benefited many civilian pursuits as well, such as weather and communication satellite control and GPS location-finding, which would be impossible without highly accurate models for the figure of the Earth.

Models 
The models for the figure of the Earth vary in the way they are used, in their complexity, and in the accuracy with which they represent the size and shape of the Earth.

Sphere 

The simplest model for the shape of the entire Earth is a sphere. While "radius" normally is a characteristic of perfect spheres, the Earth deviates from spherical by only a third of a percent, sufficiently close to treat it as a sphere in many contexts and justifying the term "the radius of the Earth".

The concept of a spherical Earth dates back to around the 6th century BC, but remained a matter of philosophical speculation until the 3rd century BC. The first scientific estimation of the radius of the Earth was given by Eratosthenes about 240 BC, with estimates of the accuracy of Eratosthenes's measurement ranging from −1% to 15%.

The Earth is only approximately spherical, so no single value serves as its natural radius. The difference  correspond to the polar radius being approximately 0.3% shorter than the equatorial radius.

Ellipsoid of revolution

Since the Earth is flattened at the poles and bulges at the Equator, geodesy represents the figure of the Earth as an oblate spheroid. The oblate spheroid, or oblate ellipsoid, is an ellipsoid of revolution obtained by rotating an ellipse about its shorter axis. It is the regular geometric shape that most nearly approximates the shape of the Earth. A spheroid describing the figure of the Earth or other celestial body is called a reference ellipsoid. The reference ellipsoid for Earth is called an Earth ellipsoid.

An ellipsoid of revolution is uniquely defined by two quantities. Several conventions for expressing the two quantities are used in geodesy, but they are all equivalent to and convertible with each other:
 Equatorial radius  (called semimajor axis), and polar radius  (called semiminor axis);
  and eccentricity ;
  and flattening .
Eccentricity and flattening are different ways of expressing how squashed the ellipsoid is. When flattening appears as one of the defining quantities in geodesy, generally it is expressed by its reciprocal. For example, in the WGS 84 spheroid used by today's GPS systems, the reciprocal of the flattening  is set to be exactly .

The difference between a sphere and a reference ellipsoid for Earth is small, only about one part in 300. Historically, flattening was computed from grade measurements. Nowadays, geodetic networks and satellite geodesy are used. In practice, many reference ellipsoids have been developed over the centuries from different surveys. The flattening value varies slightly from one reference ellipsoid to another, reflecting local conditions and whether the reference ellipsoid is intended to model the entire Earth or only some portion of it.

A sphere has a single radius of curvature, which is simply the radius of the sphere. More complex surfaces have radii of curvature that vary over the surface. The radius of curvature describes the radius of the sphere that best approximates the surface at that point. Oblate ellipsoids have constant radius of curvature east to west along parallels, if a graticule is drawn on the surface, but varying curvature in any other direction. For an oblate ellipsoid, the polar radius of curvature  is larger than the equatorial

because the pole is flattened: the flatter the surface, the larger the sphere must be to approximate it. Conversely, the ellipsoid's north–south radius of curvature at the equator  is smaller than the polar

(semi-minor axis)

Geoid 

It was stated earlier that measurements are made on the apparent or topographic surface of the Earth and it has just been explained that computations are performed on an ellipsoid. One other surface is involved in geodetic measurement: the geoid. In geodetic surveying, the computation of the geodetic coordinates of points is commonly performed on a reference ellipsoid closely approximating the size and shape of the Earth in the area of the survey. The actual measurements made on the surface of the Earth with certain instruments are however referred to the geoid. The ellipsoid is a mathematically defined regular surface with specific dimensions. The geoid, on the other hand, coincides with that surface to which the oceans would conform over the entire Earth if free to adjust to the combined effect of the Earth's mass attraction (gravitation) and the centrifugal force of the Earth's rotation. As a result of the uneven distribution of the Earth's mass, the geoidal surface is irregular and, since the ellipsoid is a regular surface, the separations between the two, referred to as geoid undulations, geoid heights, or geoid separations, will be irregular as well.

The geoid is a surface along which the gravity potential is everywhere equal and to which the direction of gravity is always perpendicular (see equipotential surface). The latter is particularly important because optical instruments containing gravity-reference leveling devices are commonly used to make geodetic measurements. When properly adjusted, the vertical axis of the instrument coincides with the direction of gravity and is, therefore, perpendicular to the geoid. The angle between the plumb line which is perpendicular to the geoid (sometimes called "the vertical") and the perpendicular to the ellipsoid (sometimes called "the ellipsoidal normal") is defined as the deflection of the vertical. It has two components: an east–west and a north–south component.

Other shapes 
The possibility that the Earth's equator is better characterized as an ellipse rather than a circle and therefore that the ellipsoid is triaxial has been a matter of scientific inquiry for many years. Modern technological developments have furnished new and rapid methods for data collection and, since the launch of Sputnik 1, orbital data have been used to investigate the theory of ellipticity. More recent results indicate a 70-m difference between the two equatorial major and minor axes of inertia, with the larger semidiameter pointing to 15° W longitude (and also 180-degree away).

Pear shape 
The theory of a slightly pear-shaped Earth arose and gained publicity after the first artificial satellites observed long periodic orbital variations, indicating a depression at the South Pole and a bulge of the same degree at the North Pole. This theory contends that the northern middle latitudes are slightly flattened and the southern middle latitudes correspondingly bulged. U.S. Vanguard 1 satellite data from 1958 confirms that the southern equatorial bulge is greater than that of the north, which is corroborated by the South Pole's sea level being lower than that of the north. A pear-shaped Earth had first been theorized in 1498 by Christopher Columbus, based on his incorrect readings of the North Star's diurnal motion.

John A. O'Keefe and co-authors are credited with the discovery that the Earth had a significant third degree zonal spherical harmonic in its gravitational field using Vanguard 1 satellite data. Based on further satellite geodesy data, Desmond King-Hele refined the estimate to a 45-m difference between north and south polar radii, owing to a 19-m "stem" rising in the North Pole and a 26-m depression in the South Pole. The polar asymmetry is small, though: it is about a thousand times smaller than the earth's flattening and even smaller than the geoidal undulation in some regions of the Earth.

Local approximations 

Simpler local approximations are possible.

Local tangent plane 

The local tangent plane is appropriate for very small distances.

Osculating sphere 

The best local spherical approximation to the ellipsoid in the vicinity of a given point is the Earth's osculating sphere. Its radius equals Earth's Gaussian radius of curvature, and its radial direction coincides with the geodetic normal direction. The center of the osculating sphere is offset from the center of the ellipsoid, but is at the center of curvature for the given point on the ellipsoid surface. This concept aids the interpretation of terrestrial and planetary radio occultation refraction measurements and in some navigation and surveillance applications.

Earth rotation and Earth's interior 

Determining the exact figure of the Earth is not only a geometric task of geodesy, but also has geophysical considerations. According to theoretical arguments by Isaac Newton, Leonhard Euler, and others, a body having a uniform density of 5.515 g/cm that rotates like the Earth should have a flattening of 1:229. This can be concluded without any information about the composition of Earth's interior. However, the measured flattening is 1:298.25, which is closer to a sphere and a strong argument that Earth's core is extremely compact. Therefore, the density must be a function of the depth, ranging from 2.6 g/cm at the surface (rock density of granite, etc.), up to 13 g/cm within the inner core.

Global and regional gravity field 

Also with implications for the physical exploration of the Earth's interior is the gravitational field, which is the net effect of gravitation (due to mass attraction) and centrifugal force (due to rotation). It can be measured very accurately at the surface and remotely by satellites. True vertical generally does not correspond to theoretical vertical (deflection ranges up to 50") because topography and all geological masses disturb the gravitational field. Therefore, the gross structure of the Earth's crust and mantle can be determined by geodetic-geophysical models of the subsurface.

See also 
 Clairaut's theorem
 EGM96
 Gravity formula
 Gravity of Earth
 
 Meridian arc
 Theoretical gravity

 History
 Pierre Bouguer
Earth's circumference#History
Earth's radius#History
Flat Earth
 Friedrich Robert Helmert
History of geodesy
History of the metre
Meridian arc#History
Seconds pendulum

References 

Attribution

Further reading 
 Guy Bomford, Geodesy, Oxford 1962 and 1880.
 Guy Bomford, Determination of the European geoid by means of vertical deflections. Rpt of Comm. 14, IUGG 10th Gen. Ass., Rome 1954.
 Karl Ledersteger and Gottfried Gerstbach, Die horizontale Isostasie / Das isostatische Geoid 31. Ordnung. Geowissenschaftliche Mitteilungen Band 5, TU Wien 1975.
 Helmut Moritz and Bernhard Hofmann, Physical Geodesy. Springer, Wien & New York 2005.
 Geodesy for the Layman, Defense Mapping Agency, St. Louis, 1983.

External links 

Reference Ellipsoids (PCI Geomatics)
Reference Ellipsoids (ScanEx)
Changes in Earth shape due to climate changes
Jos Leys "The shape of Planet Earth"

Earth
Geodesy
Geophysics